Marek Suchý (born 29 March 1988) is a Czech professional footballer who plays as a centre-back for Mladá Boleslav and former captain of the Czech Republic national team.

Club career

Slavia, Spartak
Primarily a centre-back capable of performing defensive midfield roles, Suchý featured in Slavia's senior team since 2005. Although he was linked with Rangers as well as other teams in England, France and Germany in summer 2008, he stayed at Slavia. On 24 November 2009, he was loaned out to FC Spartak Moscow for one year with an option to buy for €3.5 Million. Spartak later exercised the option.

Basel
In January 2014, Suchý was loaned out to Swiss club FC Basel for the second half of the 2013–14 Swiss Super League season, with a buying option at the end of that period. He joined Basel's first team during the winter break of their 2013–14 season under head coach Murat Yakin. Suchý played his debut for Basel on 2 February 2014 in the 3–1 away win at the Stade Olympique de la Pontaise against Lausanne-Sport. Just three days later, on 5 February 2014, he scored his first goal for his new team in the Swiss Cup quarter-final match as Basel won 6–1 against Le Mont. He scored his first league goal for his new club in the home game in the St. Jakob-Park on 16 March as Basel won 1–0 against Aarau. At the end of the 2013–14 Super League season Suchý won the league championship with Basel. The team also reached the final of the 2013–14 Swiss Cup, but were beaten 2–0 by Zürich after extra time. Basel had qualified for Europa League knockout phase and here they advanced as far as the quarter-finals. But eventually they were beaten by Valencia 5–3 on aggregate, after extra time.

Basel exercised their option and bought out Suchý's contract as the loan period came to an end. For Basel's 2014–15 season Paulo Sousa was appointed as new head coach and it was a very successful season for the team. Basel entered the Champions League in the group stage. Suchý scored his first Champions League goal for his team in the home game in the St. Jakob-Park on 4 November. It was the last goal of the game as Basel won 4–0 against Ludogorets Razgrad. However, in the round of 16 they were knocked out of the competition by Porto. In the 2014–15 Swiss Cup Basel reached the final, but for the third consecutive season they finished the competition as runners-up, losing 0–3 against Sion. At the end of the 2014–15 league season Basel won the championship for the sixth time in a row. Basel played a total of 65 matches (36 Swiss League fixtures, 6 Swiss Cup, 8 Champions League and 15 test matches). Under trainer Paulo Sousa Suchý totaled 52 appearances, 30 League, four Cup, 7 Champions League, as well 11 in test games. He scored 2 goals in these matches, one of which was in the Super League, one in the Champions League.

Basel hired Urs Fischer as their new head coach for their 2015–16 season. Basel started in the 2015–16 UEFA Champions League in the third qualifying round. But in the play-off round against Maccabi Tel Aviv they were knocked out of the competition on the away goals rule. They continued in the 2015–16 UEFA Europa League group stage and ended this at the top of the table. The team advanced to the round of 16, but here were beaten by Sevilla 3–0 on aggregate. Suchý scored one goal in nine appearances. This goal was in the home game against Fiorentina on 26 November 2015. Under head coach Fischer, Suchý won a third consecutive Swiss championship at the end of the 2015–16 Super League season

At the end of Basel's 2016–17 season, Suchý won the championship with the club for the fourth consecutive time. For the club this was the eighth title in a row and their 20th championship title in total. They also won the 2016–17 Swiss Cup, defeating Sion 3–0 in the final, which meant they had won the double.

In Basel's 2017–18 season Raphaël Wicky was appointed as new head coach and Suchý was appointed as new team captain, following Matías Delgado's retirement from his active career. In the domestic league Basel ended the season in second position and in the Cup they reached the semi-final only to be defeated by Young Boys. The team entered the Champions League in the group stage, ending this in second position in the table. They advanced to the round of 16 but, despite an away win in the Etihad Stadium, Basel were knocked out of the competition by Manchester City 5–2 on aggregate.

Basel's 2018–19 season started badly. Already in the preparation games things went wrong and as the team started their league season they lost the first game against St. Gallen. Head coach Raphaël Wicky was replaced by Marcel Koller. But things were not much better. Suchý injured himself during the game on 12 August 2018 and didn't play in another game that year. Basel ended the league season in second position, with a massiv 20 points residue behind champions Young Boys. However, Basel won the Swiss Cup in the 2018–19 season. In the first round Basel beat FC Montlingen 3–0, in the second round Echallens Région 7–2 and in the round of 16 Winterthur 1–0. In the quarter finals Sion were defeated 4–2 after extra time and in the semi finals Zürich were defeated 3–1. All these games were played away from home. The final was held on 19 May 2019 in the Stade de Suisse Wankdorf Bern against Thun. Striker Albian Ajeti scored the first goal, Fabian Frei the second for Basel, then Dejan Sorgić netted a goal for Thun, but the result was 2–1 for Basel. Suchý played in three cup games.

At the end of the season the club announced that Suchý had decided not to extend his contract and he left Basel to start a new challenge elsewhere.

During his five and a half years with the club, Suchý played a total of 265 games for Basel scoring a total of 14 goals. 163 of these games were in the Swiss Super League, 20 in the Swiss Cup, 41 in the UEFA competitions (Champions League and Europa League) and 41 were friendly games. He scored 11 goals in the domestic league, one in the cup and two in the European games.

FC Augsburg
On 8 July 2019, Suchý joined FC Augsburg on a two-year deal.

International career
Suchý was an integral member of the Czech Republic national team that was defeated by Argentina in the final of the 2007 FIFA U-20 World Cup.

Career statistics

Club

International
Scores and results list Czech Republic's goal tally first, score column indicates score after each Suchý goal.

Honours
Slavia Prague 
 Czech First League: 2007–08, 2008–09

Basel
 Swiss Super League: 2013–14, 2014–15, 2015–16, 2016–17
 Swiss Cup: 2016–17, 2018–19

Czech Rupublic U-21
 FIFA U-20 World Cup runner-up: 2007

Individual
 The annual Golden Ball awards in 2006, the "Revelation of the Year" award for young player of the year.

References

External links

 
 Official international statistics 
 Profile on FC Basel website
 Profile on the website of the Swiss Football League

1988 births
Living people
Footballers from Prague
Czech footballers
Czech Republic youth international footballers
Czech Republic under-21 international footballers
Czech Republic international footballers
Czech expatriate footballers
Association football defenders
Czech First League players
SK Slavia Prague players
FC Spartak Moscow players
FC Basel players
FC Augsburg players
FK Mladá Boleslav players
Russian Premier League players
Swiss Super League players
Bundesliga players
UEFA Euro 2012 players
UEFA Euro 2016 players
Expatriate footballers in Russia
Expatriate footballers in Switzerland
Expatriate footballers in Germany
Czech expatriate sportspeople in Switzerland
Czech expatriate sportspeople in Russia
Czech expatriate sportspeople in Germany